The 23rd congressional district of Illinois was a congressional district for the United States House of Representatives in Illinois. It was eliminated as a result of the redistricting cycle after the 1980 Census. It was last represented by Melvin Price who was redistricted into the 21st district.

List of members representing the district

Electoral history

1920 – 1912

1910 – 1902

References 

 Congressional Biographical Directory of the United States 1774–present

Former congressional districts of the United States
23
1903 establishments in Illinois
Constituencies established in 1903
1983 disestablishments in Illinois
Constituencies disestablished in 1983